This is a list of giant pandas, both alive and deceased. The giant panda is a conservation-reliant vulnerable species. Wild population estimates vary; one estimate shows that there are about 1,590 individuals living in the wild, while a 2006 study via DNA analysis estimated that this figure could be as high as 2,000 to 3,000.

List of famous giant pandas

Famous living giant pandas

Deceased famous giant pandas

In zoos

Asia
Mainland China

Many zoos and breeding centers in China house giant pandas. These include:
Beijing Zoo – Home of Gu Gu. The zoo also housed Ming-Ming (d. 2011 May 7), the first panda born in captivity.
Shanghai Zoo
Bifengxia Panda Base, Ya'an, Sichuan, is home to US-born giant pandas Mei Sheng (M), Hua Mei (F), Tai Shan (M), Su Lin (F), and Zhen Zhen (F). It is also home to the Austrian-born Fu Long.
Chengdu Research Base of Giant Panda Breeding, Chengdu, Sichuan – More than 100 individual giant pandas and red pandas. Twelve cubs were born here in 2006. It is also home to Japanese-born Xiong Bang (M) and US-born Mei Lan (M).
Chengdu Zoo, Chengdu, Sichuan
China Conservation and Research Center for the Giant Panda at the Wolong National Nature Reserve, Sichuan – Seventeen cubs were born here in 2006.
Chongqing Zoo, Chongqing
Chime-Long Paradise Amusement Park, in Guangzhou, where three very rare panda triplets were born (all three have thus far survived) in July 2014
Dalian Forest Zoo – home to Fei Yun (F), Cai Zhen (F) and Jin Hu (M) of Wolong origin

Other places in Asia
Ocean Park, Hong Kong –  An (M), Le Le (M), and Ying Ying (F)
Macau Giant Panda Pavilion – home to Kai Kai (M) and Xin Xin (M) of Chengdu origin
Taipei Zoo, Taipei, Taiwan – home to Tuan Tuan (M) and Yuan Yuan (F), and their daughters Yuan Zai (F) and Yuan Bao (F).
Chiang Mai Zoo, Chiang Mai, Thailand – home to Chuang Chuang (M), Lin Hui (F), and Lin Bing, a female cub born 27 May 2009.
Adventure World, Shirahama, Wakayama, Japan – Until recently, it was home to Ei Mei (M), Mei Mei (F), Rau Hin (F), Ryu Hin and Syu Hin (M twins), and Kou Hin (M). In December 2006, twin cubs were born to Ei Mei and Mei Mei. Two cubs, Eiihin (M) and Meihin (F), were born to Rau Hin on 13 September 2008. Mei Mei, a mother of ten cubs, died on 15 October 2008.
Kobe Oji Zoo, Hyōgo, Japan – home of Kou Kou (M), Tan Tan (F)
River Safari, a new park under Wildlife Reserves Singapore. Singapore received two pandas (Kai Kai and Jia Jia) in 2012.
Taman Safari, Bogor, West Java, Indonesia. On 28 September 2017, Indonesia received two pandas on loan from China Government named Hu Chun (F) and Cai Tao (M).
Ueno Zoo, Taitō, Tokyo, Japan - Ri Ri (M), Shin Shin (F), and their daughter Xiang Xiang (F), her little brother Xiao Xiao(M) and sister Rei Rei(F).
Zoo Negara, Kuala Lumpur, Malaysia – home to Feng Yi (known as Xing Xing) (M), and Fu Wa (known as Liang Liang) (F) since 21 May 2014. A female cub was born on 18 August 2015.
Everland Zootopia, Yongin, South Korea - home of Le Bao (M), Ai Bao (F), and their daughter Fu Bao (F).

Australia
Adelaide Zoo, is home to Wang Wang (M) and Fu Ni (F). They arrived on 28 November 2009, and went on display on 14 December. They are expected to stay for a minimum of 10 years, and are the only giant pandas living in the Southern Hemisphere.

Europe

 Berlin Zoological Garden, Germany is the former home of Bao Bao, which died in 2012 at the age of 34. He was the oldest male panda living in captivity at the time of his death and had lived in Berlin for twenty five years. He never reproduced. The couple Jiao Qing and Meng Meng live since 2017 in Berlin. In 2019 they had their twin boys named Meng Yuan and Meng Xiang, also nicknamed Pit and Paule. 
 Tiergarten Schönbrunn, Vienna, Austria – home to Yang Yang (F) and Long Hui (M), born in Wolong, China in 2000. They gave birth to Fu Long (M) in 2007, Fu Hu (M) in 2010 and Fu Bao (M) in 2013. Fu Long, who has been relocated to China, was the first to be born in Europe in 25 years. On the 7. August 2016 twins were born: Fu Feng and Fu Ban.
 Zoo Aquarium, Madrid, Spain is the home of Bing Xing (M) and Hua Zuiba (F) since 2007. They gave birth to twin cubs on 7 September 2010. Another cub, Xing Bao (F), was born in 2013 and in September 2016 Chulina (F). The zoo was also the site of the first giant panda birth in Europe, Chulin (M) in 1982 whose parents, Shao Shao (F) and Chang Chang (M), arrived in 1978. Chulin (M, 1982) was the first panda to be born in captivity in the western hemisphere and by artificial insemination outside China
 The Edinburgh Zoo, Scotland – home to Tian Tian (F) and Yang Guang (M) since 4 December 2011.
 ZooParc de Beauval, Saint-Aignan, Loir-et-Cher, France – home to Huan Huan (F) and Yuan Zi (M) since 15 January 2012.
 Pairi Daiza, Cambron-Casteau, Belgium – home to Hao Hao (F) and Xing Hui (M) since February 2014; New born baby on 1 June 2016.
 Ouwehands Dierenpark, Rhenen, the Netherlands - home to Xing Ya (M) and Wu Wen (F) since April 2017.
 Ähtäri Zoo, Ähtäri, Finland - home to Lumi (Jin BaoBao) and Pyry (Hua Bao) since January 2018.
 Copenhagen Zoo, Copenhagen, Denmark - home to Mao Sun (F) and Xing Er (M) since April 2019.
Moscow Zoo, Moscow, Russia - home to female Ding Ding and male Ru Yi since 29 April 2019.

North America

 Chapultepec Zoo, Mexico City – home of Xiu Hua, born on 25 June 1985, Shuan Shuan, born on 15 June 1987, and Xin Xin, born on 1 July 1990 from Tohui (Tohui born on Chapultepec Zoo on 21 July 1981 and died on 16 November 1993), all females
 National Zoo in Washington, DC – home of Mei Xiang (F) and Tian Tian (M), and their cub Xiao Qi Ji. 
 Zoo Atlanta, Atlanta – home of Lun Lun (F), Yang Yang (M), Xi Lan (M), and Po (F), born 3 November 2010 and twin female cubs Mei Huan and Mei Lun, born 15 July 2013
 Memphis Zoo, Memphis – home of Ya Ya (F) and Le Le (M) born July 18, 1998 — February 1, 2023).
 The Toronto Zoo and Calgary Zoo are hosting a pair of pandas named Er Shun (F) and Da Mao (M). The two pandas arrived in Canada at the Toronto Zoo in March 2013 (two months before the exhibit opened in May), and will spend 10 years in Canada, evenly split between Toronto and Calgary. For Toronto this will be the second set of pandas: Quan Quan (Female, died 2010 at Jinan Zoo at age 21) and Qing Qing (Female born Sept 9, 1984 and later at Wuhan Zoo and now at Chengdu Panda Base) were sent to the zoo for 100 days beginning in July 1985.

North American-born pandas

Tohui (Tarahumara word for child), born 21 July 1981, died 16 November 1993, a female at Chapultepec Zoo, Mexico City, was the first giant panda to be born and survive in captivity outside China. Her parents were Ying Ying and Pe Pe. 
Hua Mei, was born 1999 in the San Diego Zoo and sent to China in 2004.
Mei Sheng, born 2003 at the San Diego Zoo, sent to China 2007.
Tai Shan, born 9 July 2005 at the National Zoo in Washington, DC, was sent to China in 2010.
Su Lin was born 2 August 2005 at the San Diego Zoo and moved to China in 2010.
Mei Lan, born 6 September 2006 at Zoo Atlanta, was sent to China in 2010.
Zhen Zhen, born 3 August 2007 at the San Diego Zoo, was moved to China in 2010.
Xi Lan, born 30 August 2008 at Zoo Atlanta, was moved to China in 2014.
Yun Zi, born 5 August 2009 at the San Diego Zoo, was moved to China in 2014.
Po, born 3 November 2010 at Zoo Atlanta
Xiao Liwu, born 29 July 2012 at the San Diego Zoo
Bao Bao, born 23 August 2013 at the National Zoo in Washington, DC, moved to China on 21 February 2017.
Bei Bei and an unnamed twin were born 22 August 2015 to Mei Xiang at the National Zoo in Washington, DC. The smaller of the two cubs died on 26 August 2015.
Twins Jia Panpan and Jia Yueyue, born 13 October 2015 to Er Shun at the Toronto Zoo. The father is to be determined, but likely Da Mao.
Mei Lun and Mei Huan
Xiao Qi Ji was born 21 August 2020 to Mei Xiang at the National Zoo in Washington, DC. He will reside at the zoo until 2023.

See also
 Endangered species
 Giant pandas around the world
 Wildlife of China
 List of individual bears

References

External links
 WWF – environmental conservation organization
 Giant Panda Species Survival Plan
 Pandas International – panda conservation group
 National Zoo Live Panda Cams – Baby Panda Tai Shan and mother Mei Xiang
 Taipei Zoo YouTube Channel
 Yuan Zai Cam

Giant pandas
 
Panda
Giant pandas